Danis is a genus of butterflies in the family Lycaenidae. The species of this genus are found in the Australasian realm.

Species
Danis absyrtus Felder & Felder 1859
Danis albomarginata Rothschild, 1915 Misol
Danis albostrigata Bethune-Baker, 1908 New Guinea 
Danis anaximens Fruhstorfer, 1907 Kumusi River New Guinea
Danis annamensis Fruhstorfer, 1903
Danis aryanus Grose-Smith, 1895 Halmahera
Danis athanetus Danis melimnos ssp. athanetus Fruhstorfer, 1915 New Guinea
Danis beata Röber, 1926 New Guinea
Danis caelinus Grose-Smith
Danis caesius Grose-Smith, 1894 New Guinea
Danis caledonica Felder and Felder, 1865
Danis carissima Grose-Smith & Kirby, 1895 Watter and Pura (Philippines?) 
Danis coelinus Grose-Smith, 1898 Fergusson Island
Danis concolor
Danis coroneia Fruhstorfer, 1915 New Hannover
Danis danis
Danis dispar Grose-Smith & Kirby, 1895 New Britain
Danis dissimilis Joicey & Talbot, 1916 Schouten Islands
Danis drucei
Danis ekeikei Bethune-Baker, 1908 New Guinea
Danis esme Grose-Smith, 1894 New Britain
Danis glaucopis Grose-Smith, 1894
Danis hamilcar Grose-Smith, 1894 New Britain
Danis hanno Grose-Smith, 1894 New Britain
Danis helga Grose-Smith, 1898 Jobi
Danis hengis Grose-Smith, 1897 New Guinea
Danis hermes Grose-Smith, 1894 New Guinea
Danis hermogenes = Danis wallacei ssp. hermogenes Fruhstorfer, 1915
Danis herophilus = Danis danis ssp. herophilus Fruhstorfer, 1915 Waigeu
Danis horsa Grose-Smith, 1898 Ron Island Geelvink Channel
Danis intermedius Röber
Danis irregularis Ribbe, 1899
Danis karpaia Druce
Danis lampros Druce, 1897 Trobriand Islands
Danis lamprosides Grose-Smith, 1898 Trobriand Islands
Danis latifascia = Danis danis latifascia (Rothschild, 1915) Admiralty Islands
Danis lona Röber, 1927 Waigeu
Danis lygia
Danis mamberanano Joicey & Talbot, 1916 New Guinea (River Mamberano, Dutch New Guinea)
Danis manto Grose-Smith & Kirby, 1896 New Guinea
Danis melimnos H. H. Druce and Bethune-Baker, 1893
Danis metrophanes = Danis wallacei ssp. metrophanes Fruhstorfer, 1915 New Guinea
Danis moutoni = Danis hanno ssp. moutoni Ribbe, 1899
Danis occidentalis = Danis danis occidentalis (Röber, 1926)
Danis olga Grose-Smith, 1808 New Guinea
Danis oribasius = Danis perpheres ssp. oribastus Fruhstorfer, 1915
Danis panatius = Danis danis ssp. panatius Fruhstorfer, 1915
Danis peri Grose-Smith, 1894 New Guinea
Danis philocrates = Danis danis ssp. philocrates Fruhstorfer, 1915 Obi Islands
Danis phoibides = Danis danis ssp. phoibides Fruhstorfer, 1915 Mefor
Danis phroso Grose-Smith, 1897 New Guinea
Danis piepersi Snellen, 1878 Celebes, Banggai Islands, Sula Islands 
Danis plateni Grose-Smith & Kirby, 1896 Waigeu
Danis plotinus Grose-Smith & Kirby, 1896
Danis proedrus = Danis danis ssp. proedrus Fruhstorfer, 1915
Danis pseudochrania Röber
Danis pseudochromia = Danis hamilcar ssp. pseudochromia Ribbe, 1899 = Nacaduba cyanea hamilcar Grose-Smith, 1894
Danis regalis 
Danis reverdini Fruhstorfer, 1915 Cape York Peninsula 
Danis rosselana Bethune-Baker, 1908 Rossel Island
Danis sakitatus = Danis piepersi ssp. sakitatus Ribbe, 1926 Celebes
Danis salamandri Semper
Danis scarpheia = Danis melimnos ssp. scarpheia Fruhstorfer, 1915
Danis schaeffera (Eschscholtz, 1821)
Danis sebae
Danis smaragdus Grose-Smith
Danis sophron = Danis danis ssp. sophron Fruhstorfer, 1915 Buru
Danis soranus = Danis schaeffera ssp. soranus Fruhstorfer, 1915 Halmahera
Danis stephani Grose-Smith & Kirby, 1896
Danis subsuleima Strand, 1929 = Danis danis ssp. latifascia Rothschild, 1915
Danis suleima Grose-Smith, 1898 = Danis danis suleima (Grose-Smith) Louisiade Archipelago
Danis supous Druce & Bethune-Baker, 1893 Aru Islands
Danis thinophilus = Dani danis ssp. thinophilus Toxopeus, 1930
Danis triopus de Nicéville, 1898 Kai Islands
Danis valestinax = Danis peri ssp. valestinax Fruhstorfer, 1915 = Perpheres perpheres valestinax Fruhstorfer, 1915 New Guinea
Danis wallacei 
Danis vidua Grose-Smith & Kirby, 1895 Waigeu
Danis wollastoni Rothschild, 1917 New Guinea
Danis zainis = Danis wallacei ssp. zainis Fruhstorfer, 1915 New Guinea
Danis zuleika Grose-Smith, 1898 Louisiade Archipelago

References

External links
Henley Grose-Smith publications

 
Lycaenidae genera